A digging bar is a long, straight metal bar used for various purposes, including as a post hole digger, to break up or loosen hard or compacted materials such as soil, rock, concrete and ice or as a lever to move objects. Known by other names depending on locale, structural features and intended purpose such as a hop bar or crowbar in Britain, Australia and New Zealand, and slate bar, shale bar, spud bar, pinch point bar or San Angelo bar in North America, or just a bar. In Hawaii, a similar, traditional wooden device known as an  ‘o‘o stick is used as a digging bar in groundbreaking ceremonies. Not to be confused with a curved crowbar, which is designed to provide leverage rather than to dig.

Uses

Common uses of digging bars include breaking up clay, concrete, frozen ground, and other hard materials, moving or breaking up tree roots and obstacles, and making holes in the ground for fence posts. They are often used where space would not allow the use of a pickaxe.

Materials and construction
The ends of a digging bar are shaped for various purposes. Typically, each end has a different shape so as to provide two different tool functions in one tool. Common end shapes include:
 Blunt — a broad, blunt surface for tamping.
 Point — for breaking hard materials and prying.
 Wedge — an unsharpened blade for digging, breaking and prying. A San Angelo bar has a wedge at one end.
 Chisel — a sharpened blade for cutting roots, digging and prying. A pinch point bar has a chisel at one end.

Variants

Bark spud

Log-peeling spuds are used to remove the bark from logs. This tool is also called a Bark spud or a barking iron.

Hop bar

A hop bar (also Hop pitcher) is used to make holes in the ground for hop poles,  or more long with a heavy, bulbous spike at the digging end.

Ice spud

Fishing through holes in ice is common in many parts of the world. One of the earliest methods of cutting these holes was to use a device variously known as an ice spud or ice chisel. Many chisel variations exist, including jagged teeth, skewed edges, and different grind angles and chisel widths. Early ice spuds (before about 1925) often had wooden handles and a steel chisel fixed with a tang and collar or socket, similar to a carpenter's chisel. Ice spuds are still carried by many ice fishermen as a means to test ice thickness and safety; a single forceful thrust of the ice spud will often penetrate unsafe ice.

Lining bar

A lining bar is used to shift the alignment of railroad tracks, to manipulate some types of railroad track jacks, to "nip up" or lift ties and rails, and as a digging tool. Lining bars have a tapered form. They often have a square cross section between one and 1-1/2 inches at one end. They may have a pyramidal, wedge, or pinch point. They transition to a tapered round cross section 12 to 18 inches from the point. The handle end may terminate in a ball or may be cut off squarely at 5/8 to 3/4 inch diameter. They are made of forged steel and may be from five to six feet long. Lining bars may also be called jack bars, jack handles, or crowbars in North American railroad jargon.

Spud bar

A spud bar has a chisel at one end that is intended for removing material through a chipping or shaving action. Some have plastic grips on the shaft and some have wider chisel ends, or "rakes", for specific jobs such as removing old shingles and tar paper.

References

Mechanical hand tools